Peter Denis Hill-Wood (25 February 1936 – 28 December 2018) was a British businessman and a chairman of Arsenal Football Club.

Biography
Hill-Wood was born in Kensington, London, son of Denis Hill-Wood and his wife Mary Smith.
His father, three uncles and grandfather all played first-class cricket for Derbyshire County Cricket Club.

Peter Hill-Wood attended Ludgrove School and Eton College, where he was a classmate of former Arsenal director Sir Roger Gibbs. He then served in the Coldstream Guards. After leaving the Guards, Hill-Wood entered the banking industry, eventually rising to become a vice-chairman of Hambros Bank, having previously been in charge of its investment division.

After Hill-Wood retired from his post at Hambros, he was a director of Cavenham Ltd and Hellenic and General Trust.

Arsenal chairmanship
He was the third generation of his family to serve as chairman of Arsenal, following his father, Denis Hill-Wood (in office 1962–1982), and his grandfather, Samuel Hill-Wood (1929–1936 and 1946–1949) from Glossop, Derbyshire. Peter Hill-Wood succeeded his father after the latter's death in 1982. He was not in charge of any day-to-day business at the club, which was generally run by David Dein and a succession of first team managers.

Hill-Wood was a colleague of Chips Keswick – a former Bank of England director – at Hambros and subsequently saw him recruited to the Arsenal board to provide strong City of London contacts at a time when the club were financing their new stadium.

Hill-Wood sold much of his family holdings in the club to former vice-chairman David Dein in the 1980s and 1990s and the rest to Stan Kroenke.

On 14 June 2013 Hill-Wood stepped down and was replaced as chairman by Keswick.

Other
He played first-class cricket for the Free Foresters Cricket Club in 1960.
He and Chips Keswick were both members of Business for Sterling.

Personal life
He married Sally Andrews in 1971 and had three children.

Health
On 2 December 2012, Arsenal announced Hill-Wood had suffered a heart attack and was recovering in hospital. On 28 December 2018, it was reported that Hill-Wood had died, aged 82.

References

External links
 Peter Hill-Wood at Cricket Archive

1936 births
2018 deaths
People from Kensington
Arsenal F.C. directors and chairmen
British bankers
English cricketers
Coldstream Guards officers
Free Foresters cricketers
People educated at Ludgrove School
People educated at Eton College